The 1976 Spanish Grand Prix (formally the XXII Gran Premio de España) was a Formula One motor race held at the Circuito del Jarama in Madrid, Spain on 2 May 1976. The race was the fourth round of the 1976 Formula One season. The race was the 22nd Spanish Grand Prix and the sixth to be held at Jarama. The race was held over 75 laps of the 3.404-kilometre circuit for a total race distance of 255 kilometres.

Initially the declared winner was Austrian Ferrari driver Niki Lauda driving a Ferrari 312T2 extending his Drivers' Championship lead to 23 points after first across the line James Hunt had his McLaren M23 disqualified in post-race scrutineering. Swedish driver Gunnar Nilsson took his Lotus 77 to second place with Carlos Reutemann finishing third in his Brabham BT45.

McLaren appealed the disqualification and in July the appeal was upheld and Hunt re-instated as winner of the Spanish Grand Prix.

Summary
As the European season began, new cars were launched as organisers were due to start enforcing new regulations for 1976 having allowed an easing in period over the first three races. There was a big talking point as the Tyrrell team entered a new P34 six-wheeler for Patrick Depailler. Depailler was on the pace and qualified third, behind Hunt and Lauda. Lauda, driving with broken ribs after an accident driving a tractor once again beat Hunt off the line at the start and led for the first third of the race. Depailler, after a slow start, was running fourth behind Mass when he spun off and crashed with brake problems. Just before mid-race, the McLarens of Hunt and Mass found another gear and drove past Lauda, but towards the end of the race, Mass had to retire with an engine failure. Hunt took his first win of the season, with Lauda second and Gunnar Nilsson's Lotus third.

After the race, scrutineers examined the bulk of the field and Hunt was disqualified because his McLaren was found to be 1.5cm too wide and Lauda was declared the winner. One of the new rules which came into force on 1 May 1976 defined how wide a Formula One car could be. McLaren appealed the decision. Two months after the race, McLaren's appeal was successful as the tribunal considered that the 1.5cm difference was "minimal" and Hunt was reinstated as the winner of the Spanish Grand Prix.

Chris Amon's 5th place made him the last driver from New Zealand to score points in Formula One until Brendon Hartley finished 10th in the 2018 Azerbaijan Grand Prix some 42 years later.

Classification

Qualifying

*Drivers with a red background failed to qualify

Race

Championship standings after the race
Points shown represent points standings after the race when Hunt was disqualified. His nine points for winning the race were not re-instated until much later in the season.

Drivers' Championship standings

Constructors' Championship standings

Note: Only the top five positions are included for both sets of standings.
Note 2: Results as shown are before any changes due to decision of stewards.

References

Spanish Grand Prix
Spanish Grand Prix
Grand Prix